KRRX is a commercial radio station licensed in Burney, California, broadcasting to the Redding, California and Red Bluff, California areas on 106.1 FM.  KRRX airs an active rock music format branded as "106 X".

KRRX is owned by Stephens Media Group.

References

External links
KRRX official website

RRX
Active rock radio stations in the United States